{{DISPLAYTITLE:E7 polytope}}

In 7-dimensional geometry, there are 127 uniform polytopes with E7 symmetry. The three simplest forms are the 321, 231, and 132 polytopes, composed of 56, 126, and 576 vertices respectively.

They can be visualized as symmetric orthographic projections in Coxeter planes of the E7 Coxeter group, and other subgroups.

Graphs 
Symmetric orthographic projections of these 127 polytopes can be made in the E7, E6, D6, D5, D4, D3, A6, A5, A4, A3, A2 Coxeter planes. Ak has k+1 symmetry, Dk has 2(k-1) symmetry, and E6 and E7  have 12, 18 symmetry respectively.

For 10 of 127 polytopes (7 single rings, and 3 truncations), they are shown in these 9 symmetry planes, with vertices and edges drawn, and vertices colored by the number of overlapping vertices in each projective position.

References
 H.S.M. Coxeter:
 H.S.M. Coxeter, Regular Polytopes, 3rd Edition, Dover New York, 1973
 Kaleidoscopes: Selected Writings of H.S.M. Coxeter, edited by F. Arthur Sherk, Peter McMullen, Anthony C. Thompson, Asia Ivic Weiss, Wiley-Interscience Publication, 1995,  Wiley::Kaleidoscopes: Selected Writings of H.S.M. Coxeter
 (Paper 22) H.S.M. Coxeter, Regular and Semi Regular Polytopes I, [Math. Zeit. 46 (1940) 380-407, MR 2,10]
 (Paper 23) H.S.M. Coxeter, Regular and Semi-Regular Polytopes II, [Math. Zeit. 188 (1985) 559-591]
 (Paper 24) H.S.M. Coxeter, Regular and Semi-Regular Polytopes III, [Math. Zeit. 200 (1988) 3-45]
 N.W. Johnson: The Theory of Uniform Polytopes and Honeycombs, Ph.D. Dissertation, University of Toronto, 1966
 

7-polytopes